Ultimate Guinness World Records is a UK television show on Challenge which was broadcast in 2004. The show features clips from 1999—2012 of Guinness World Record attempts.  A similar show, New Zealand UGWR, airs in New Zealand.

References

2006 British television series debuts
Guinness World Records